Henry Alfred "Harry" Beck, (21 February 1901 – 1979) also known as Harold Beck, was an English footballer who played in the Football League for Walsall, Barrow, York City and Wrexham.

References

1901 births
1979 deaths
People from Walsall Wood
Sportspeople from Walsall
English footballers
Association football central defenders
Rushall Olympic F.C. players
Walsall F.C. players
Darlaston Town F.C. players
Cannock Town F.C. players
Burton Town F.C. players
Stafford Rangers F.C. players
Barrow A.F.C. players
York City F.C. players
Wrexham A.F.C. players
Glentoran F.C. players
Dudley Town F.C. players
English Football League players